The Turkish ney is an end-blown flute made of reed, an Ottoman variation on the ancient ney.  Together with the Turkish tanbur lute and Turkish kemençe fiddle are considered the most typical instruments of Classical Turkish music. The ney also plays a primary role in the music of the Mevlevi Sufi rites (semâ).

Description
A rim-blown, oblique flute made of giant reed (Arundo donax), the Turkish ney has six finger-holes on the front and a high-set thumb-hole on the back.  The thumb hole is not centered but rather is angled to the left or right depending on whether the instrument was intended to be played with the left or right hand on top.

A feature that distinguishes it from similar instruments of other cultures is the flared mouthpiece or lip rest, called a bashpare, traditionally made of water buffalo horn, ivory, or ebony, but in modern times many are plastic or similar durable material.

The Turkish ney is played by pressing the bashpare against nearly-closed lips and angling the flute so that a narrow air stream can be blown from the center of the lips against the interior edge to the left or right, depending on whether the flute is left- or right-handed in construction.  This technique gives a lower volume, but a better-controlled sound compared to the technique used with the Persian ney or the Mongolian tsuur, which are played by tucking the mouthpiece under the upper lip and making contact with the teeth.

Besides the finger holes, the pitch is altered by adjusting the embouchure, angle, and force of the breath, with more forceful producing the higher pitches.

Compared to most fipple flutes and reed instruments, the ney is very difficult to play at first, often taking several weeks of practice to produce a proper sound at all, and even more to produce the full range of pitches.  A skilled ney player can sound around 100 identifiable different tones in a two-and-a-half octave range or more.

Sizes
Before the tone naming convention do-re-mi-etc.. was adopted in Turkey, the notes had full long names which still partially are in use in ney circles, for example as names of fingering for a given perde (the set of pitches used in the performance). 

Neys come in many lengths, each producing a different key.  Professional players usually possess a range of ney in different keys so they match other instruments in an ensemble.  
In some Turkish musical circles, the "pitch" (akord) of a ney is determined by the tone produced by its rast perde.  For example, some refer to the note generated with all holes closed, meaning Davud would be in E, Bolahenk nısfiye  would be in D, and Ṣah would be in F.  
In others, the pitch is determined using the note (perde) which matches A=440 Hz (diyapazon).  This pitch is one note higher, e.g., Mansur being A/La rather than G/Sol.   The lengths below are approximate, as it can vary somewhat due to the natural characteristics of the individual reed.

Players
A Turkish ney player is referred to as a neyzen.  A curious distinction in the Turkish language is that playing the ney is described using the verb üflemek ("blow") whereas for all other instrumentalists, one uses the verb çalmak ("play/brush").  It is speculated that the ney's close identification with the Mevlevi Sufis might be the origin of this usage (God made Adam out of mud, and then "blew" life into it).

Noted modern ney players include Niyazi Sayın, Akagündüz Kutbay, Sadreddin Özçimi, Kudsi Erguner, Süleyman Erguner (torun) and Münip Utandı.

Fingering
The following is a description of how fingering, blow angle and blow intensity (roughly represented with symbols for wind speed and direction borrowed from USNWS) are combined to create the tones in a popular scale ("Hüseyni") on a common Turkish ney type (Bolahenk). Note that some pitches can be produced two different ways.

There are hundreds of similar scales in use in classical Turkish music. Hüseyni is probably the most frequently used. A dozen of the most common scales account for an important majority of all Turkish classical music, while many are seldom used.

Related instruments
The classical Turkish ney's closest relatives in other countries, the Arab nay and the Persian ney, do not use a mouthpiece, but rather blow against the sharpened edge of the tube.  In Turkish folk music, one type of ney (dilli kaval) has a fipple; the other type (dilsiz) is a rim-blown oblique flute, as is the Turkish classical ney.  The Bulgarian kaval, a folk instrument, resembles the Turkish dilsiz folk ney.  The Romanian nai is a panpipe rather than a flute but may be related etymologically and morphologically.

Popular media

Ney Taksimi/Aziz İstanbul a composition by Münip Utandı is the most sampled Turkish ney song on the Internet, being sampled by several media. Ney Taksimi means improvisation at the ney instrument. The following is a table showing the songs that used the original sample (the first 2 min. of the recording are linked at the top row).

References
 Erguner, Süleyman. Ney metod Quarto, 351 pages, b/w, color illustr., 2 CDs. 
 Signell, Karl. "Meetings with a remarkable man: Neyzen Akagündüz Kutbay," Festschrift for Robert Garfias (in press)
 Tammer, Anthony. "Construction of the Turkish Ney," Turkish Music Quarterly V/4-VI/1 (1993)

External links
 "Construction of the Turkish Ney," by Anthony Tamer in TMQ
 "Construction of Turkish and Arabic Ney + music samples in Greece,"'
 Improvisation by Süleyman Erguner on Ṣah ney (excerpt) 00:01:58, 4.7 MB, mp3
 NEYDERGISI, The first journal only about NEY (Turkish)
 NEYZEN, a useful resource (English)
 Turkish Music Quarterly contents

See also
Kaval
Kawala
Ney

Turkish musical instruments
End-blown flutes
Sufi music
Instruments of Ottoman classical music
Instruments of Turkish makam music
Turkish inventions